The red-rumped warbling finch has been split into two species:.
 Gray-throated warbling finch, Poospiza cabanisi
 Buff-throated warbling finch, Poospiza lateralis

Animal common name disambiguation pages